The Săpoca Hospital massacre was a mass murder that occurred on 18 August 2019 at the , Buzău County, Romania. 38-year-old patient Nicolae Lungu killed seven people and injured six others using a metal stand for infusions, after which he was detained by police in the courtyard of the hospital.

Background
The Psychiatry and Safety Hospital Săpoca is a hospital in Buzău County. It was founded on the basis of a vocational school in 1960. In 2011, Săpoca Hospital was the largest of its kind in the country and had more than 850 beds.

On 27 April 2018, a man hanged himself in the courtyard of this hospital.

On 14 August 2019, Nicolae Lungu hired a neighbor to work on collecting melons. He become drunk afterward. On the same day, he arrived at the Buzău County Hospital. On 15 August 2019, he was transferred to Săpoca Psychiatric Hospital.

On 17 August 2019, his brother and three other friends visited him in the hospital. On 18 August 2019, at 1:45 a.m., a patient with alcoholism was admitted to the hospital, who was put in the same bed as the suspect, although there were empty bunks in the ward.

Attack
Around 3:00 a.m., on 18 August 2019, Nicolae Lungu attacked hospital patients using a metal infusion stand. He hit three patients in the men's room and they died immediately. After that, he went to the women's department and there struck ten patients, one of whom died on the same day. The victims could not resist because they were unconscious or tied to beds. The attack was shot on surveillance cameras. Lungu then broke the window and jumped into the hospital courtyard. He wanted to run away but was detained by chance when he appeared in the courtyard by policemen.

Victims
As a result of the attack, seven people died and six were injured. Of those, three people were killed at the scene, and ten were injured.
One of the injured people died at Buzău County Hospital that day, an 88-year-old woman died on 19 August 2019, a 79-year-old woman died on 26 August 2019, and a 74-year-old man died on 20 September 2019.

Accused
Nicolae Lungu, 38 years old at the time of the attack, lived in the village of Săgeata, Buzău County. He lived in a house with his mother, and often cursed and yelled at her. He was cruel and beat his mother when he drank alcohol. He worked in the field and in the forest. He has two brothers and a sister.

References

2019 in Romania
2019 murders in Romania
21st-century murders in Romania
Attacks on buildings and structures in Europe
Attacks on hospitals
Mass murder in 2019
Assault
Massacres in Romania